Iron Cove Creek (also known as Dobroyd Stormwater Channel), a southern tributary of the Parramatta River, is an urban stream west of Sydney Harbour, located in the inner-western Sydney suburbs of Croydon, Ashfield, Haberfield and Five Dock in New South Wales, Australia.

Iron Cove Creek traverses mostly through residential areas and parkland, making a  journey from where it surfaces in Croydon to where it empties into Iron Cove, which is a bay of the Parramatta River, at Five Dock. It also forms much of the border between Croydon and Ashfield upstream from Parramatta Road. Once a natural watercourse abound with native vegetation and wildlife, Iron Cove Creek was transformed in the late 19th century into a stormwater channel that drains a fairly large catchment area in Sydney's inner-western suburbs.

History

In the 1860s Iron Cove Creek was a freely flowing waterway which in places broadened into ponds that made excellent and picturesque swimming holes. Water birds and snakes were abundant in this area and these, like the possums and gliders that inhabited the treetops, often fell victim to the predations  of children with improvised bows and arrows and slingshots and their elders armed with more sophisticated weapons .

During the 1890s the character and appearance of Iron Cove Creek was dramatically altered. As early as 1880 Iron Cove Creek was perceived to present hazards both to the health and convenience of the local community; it tended to flood in heavy rain and to become stagnant during dry weather and, with the sanitary conditions that then prevailed, was a source of typhoid fever. Plans were made to concrete its banks, but major work did not commence until 1891. The construction of the banks was carried out by the Department of Public Works and was supervised by a local resident, William Best Chessell. It took five years and had a profound effect on the appearance and future development of Croydon. In his book Between Two Highways: the story of early Croydon, Eric Dunlop points out that as a result of the construction of canals and tunnels:

Present course

Iron Cove Creek begins as a tiny trickle in a narrow channel near Norton Street in Croydon, where it appears as a stormwater tunnel finally exiting into daylight. From here, it makes its way through a cement cutting only a few metres wide with high concrete walls on either side and passes under the Main Suburban railway line. From here until Parramatta Road it remains just a small trickle during dry weather. The canal is bounded by the fences of commercial and residential properties as well as a barbed wire fence along Etonville Parade, and is for the most part hidden from the public eye.

The creek's character does not change until it reaches the John Street bridge where the concreted channel widens significantly and the height of the banks drops about threefold. From John Street to West Street, Iron Cove Creek is flanked by a wide grass verge covered with various types of vegetation leaving potential for a recreational walking/cycling path beside the creek. There is also ample space for bush regeneration to take place by the planting of indigenous species. Adjacent to the creek on Parramatta Road are popular fast-food restaurants, a council depot and a service station. After flowing under the Parramatta Road bridge, Iron Cove Creek finally enters public parkland and becomes a broad channel probably similar to the width of the original channel. On the right is parkland and running parallel to the creek on the left bank of is Henley Marine Drive. Iron Cove Creek then passes beneath Ramsay Street, widens further, and proceeds through parkland including Timbrell Park.

The creek is very tidal here and the water level difference between low and high tide is significant. Mullet may also be seen in the lower reaches of Iron Cove Creek below Parramatta Road at high tide.

The creek empties into Iron Cove as a broad canal at the intersection of Timbrell Drive and Dobroyd Parade at Five Dock, where there is a floating boom across the creek that is designed to stop pollution entering Port Jackson.

Between Parramatta Road and Iron Cove, Iron Cove Creek forms part of the border between the federal electoral divisions of Reid and Grayndler following a 2009 redistribution.

Church Street bridge
The Church Street bridge spans Iron Cove Creek on the border of the inner-western suburbs of Croydon and Ashfield. The bridge is built of sandstone, brick, and steel.  The course of Church Street was originally defined by the track used by Burwood residents to attend St John's Ashfield, who crossed the Creek at a conveniently located large fallen tree.

Pollution

Pollution entering Iron Cove from Iron Cove Creek poses as a serious environmental problem as materials such as heavy metals, asphalt, road dust and various nutrients flow into the creek during rainfall. This problem is enhanced by the fact popular fast-food restaurants and a service station are located adjacent to Iron Cove Creek on Parramatta Road. Also, the concrete lining of the creek prevents the growth of natural vegetation such as mangroves which assist in maintaining water quality.

Iron Cove Creek supplies water and sediment enriched in copper, lead and zinc to the Iron Cove under low flow conditions and is a major source of contaminants. Increasing salinity in the lower sections of Iron Cove Creek largely controls partitioning between the particulate and dissolved phases of copper, lead and zinc. Contaminant loading to Iron Cove may be contingent on extended periods of low flow rather than high flow events during which contaminated material is rapidly exported from the estuary in a discrete surface layer. This unusual characteristic offers attractive possibilities for remediation of stormwater entering Port Jackson.

Gallery

References

Citations

Sources

External links
Sydney Water page on Iron Cove Creek (Dobroyd Stormwater Channel)
Historical photographs of Iron Cove Creek from the State Library of New South Wales can be viewed here

Iron Cove Creek Bridge – Roads and Traffic Authority
Dobroyd Stormwater Channel (Iron Cove Creek) at Aussie Heritage

Creeks and canals of Sydney
Inner West